Wang Lin may refer to:
 Lin Wang (composer) (born 1976), female Chinese composer
 Wang Lin (general) (526–573), general of the Chinese dynasties Liang Dynasty and Northern Qi
 Wang Fangqing (died 702), Tang Dynasty chancellor
 Wang Yanjun (died 935), emperor of the Five Dynasties and Ten Kingdoms Period state Min
 Wang Lin (qigong master) (1952–2017), Chinese Qigong master
 Wang Lin (swimmer) (born 1959), retired Chinese swimmer
 Wang Lin (footballer) (born 1987), Chinese footballer
 Wang Lin (badminton) (born 1989), Chinese badminton player

See also
 Wang Tian Lin (1928–2010), Chinese screenwriter and actor
 Lin Wang (Asian elephant) (1917–2003), Asian elephant